Iván or Ivan Silva may refer to:

 Iván Silva (motorcyclist) (born 1982), Spanish motorcycle road racer
 Iván Felipe Silva (born 1996), Cuban judoka
 Ivan Silva (footballer, born 1990), Portuguese football defender
 Iván Silva (footballer, born 1993), Uruguayan football defender
 Iván Silva (footballer, born 1994), Argentine football midfielder